Tramon Vernell Williams Sr. (born March 16, 1983) is a former American football cornerback who played 15 seasons in the National Football League (NFL). He played college football for Louisiana Tech, and was signed by the Houston Texans as an undrafted free agent in 2006. Williams spent much of his NFL career with the Green Bay Packers, playing with them from 2006 to 2014, and again in the 2018, 2019, and 2020 seasons. He was also member of the Cleveland Browns, Arizona Cardinals, and Baltimore Ravens.

Early years
Williams played football, basketball and ran track at Assumption High School in Napoleonville, Louisiana, but was overlooked by college football recruiters who instead scouted his teammate and friend Brandon Jacobs. In basketball, he was a four-year letter winner, winning another district title on the hardwood. In his only year of track, he finished second in the state in the long jump, second in the triple jump and third in the high jump.

After graduating in 2001, Williams attended Louisiana Tech University. Originally intending to study electrical engineering, he earned Bachelor's degrees in sociology and computer science. He had joined the Bulldogs football team as a walk-on in his freshman year. He became a starting cornerback by his junior season.

College statistics

Professional career

Houston Texans
On May 1, 2006, the Houston Texans signed Williams to a three-year, $1.09 million contract that includes a signing bonus of $10,000.

Throughout training camp, Williams competed for a roster spot as a backup cornerback and special teams player against Kevin Garrett, Von Hutchins, Derrick Johnson, and Earthwind Moreland. On September 5, 2006, the Houston Texans released Williams.

Green Bay Packers
On November 29, 2006, the Green Bay Packers signed Williams to their practice squad. He spent the remainder of the 2006 season on their practice squad.

2007
During training camp, Williams competed for a job as a backup cornerback against Jarrett Bush, Patrick Dendy, Frank Walker, Will Blackmon, and Antonio Malone. Head coach Mike McCarthy named Williams the sixth cornerback on the depth chart to begin the regular season, behind Al Harris, Charles Woodson, Jarrett Bush, Frank Walker, and Will Blackmon. Special teams coordinator Mike Stock also selected Williams to be the secondary kick returner and the fourth-string punt returner.

He made his professional regular season debut in the Green Bay Packers' season-opener against the Philadelphia Eagles and returned four kickoffs for a total of 100-yards in their 17–16 victory. In Week 5, Williams had six kickoff returns for a total of 173-yards during a 27–20 loss to the Chicago Bears. In Week 6, Williams recorded his first career tackle in the Packers' 17–14 win against the Washington Redskins. By mid-season, Williams had surpassed Blackmon and Walker on the depth chart to become the fourth cornerback. In Week 10, Williams returned a punt for a 94-yard touchdown to mark the first score of his career during the Packers' 31–17 win against the Carolina Panthers. On November 22, 2007, Williams recorded a season-high four solo tackles and two pass deflections during a 47–36 victory at the Detroit Lions in Week 12. On December 30, 2007, Williams earned his first career start in place of Charles Woodson, who was inactive due to a toe injury. Williams collected four solo tackles, two pass deflections, and made his first career interception, thrown by Jon Kitna, in the Packers' 34–13 win against the Detroit Lions in Week 17. He finished the  season with 19 combined tackles (17 solo), four pass deflections, and an interception in 16 games and one start.

The Green Bay Packers finished first in the NFC North with a 13–3 record and received home-field advantage and a first-round bye. On January 12, 2008, Williams appeared in his first career playoff game and collected four solo tackles and a pass deflection during a 42–20 win against the Seattle Seahawks in the NFC Divisional Round. The following week, he made two solo tackles and broke up a pass in the Packers' 23–20 loss the NFC Championship to the New York Giants, who eventually won Super Bowl XLII.

2008
Williams competed against Jarrett Bush and Will Blackmon throughout training camp to be the third cornerback on the depth chart. Defensive coordinator Bob Sanders named Williams the third cornerback on the depth chart to start the 2008 regular season, behind veterans Al Harris and Charles Woodson.

In Week 4, Williams earned his first start of the season after Al Harris sustained a spleen injury the previous week. He recorded two combined tackles, broke up two passes, and intercepted a pass by quarterback Brian Griese during a 30–21 loss at the Tampa Bay Buccaneers. The following week, he collected a season-high 11 combined tackles (ten solo), a pass deflection, and intercepted a pass by Matt Ryan in the Packers' 27–24 loss to the Atlanta Falcons in Week 5. On October 12, 2008, Williams made a solo tackle, broke up a pass, and an interception in a 27–17 win at the Seattle Seahawks in Week 6. His interception off of Charlie Frye marked his third consecutive game with a pick. He finished the  season with 57 combined tackles (52 solo), 14 pass deflections, and five interceptions in 16 games and nine starts.

2009
Williams entered training camp slated as the third cornerback on the Packers' depth chart. Defensive coordinator Dom Capers retained him as the third cornerback, behind Woodson and Harris, to start the regular season.

He appeared in the Green Bay Packers' season-opener against the Chicago Bears and made two combined tackles, a season-high three pass deflections, and returned an interception by Jay Cutler for 67-yards in their 21–15 victory. Williams became the starter prior to Week 8 after Al Harris tore his ACL the previous game.  In Week 13, he recorded an interception but also three pass interference penalties in a 27-14 victory over the Baltimore Ravens.  The 106 penalty yards was the most assessed against any player in a game since 2000.  In Week 14, he recorded six solo tackles and made his first career sack during a 21–14 victory at the Chicago Bears. He sacked quarterback Jay Cutler for an eight-yard loss in the fourth quarter. On January 3, 2010, Williams recorded a season-high eight combined tackles, two pass deflections, and intercepted a pass by Matt Leinart in the Packers' 33–7 win at the Arizona Cardinals in Week 17. He finished the season with 55 combined tackles (46 solo), 15 pass deflections, four interceptions, and a sack in 16 games and ten starts.

The Green Bay Packers finished second in their division with an 11–5 record. On January 10, 2010, Williams started his first career playoff game and made six combined tackles during a 51–45 loss at the Arizona Cardinals in the NFC Wildcard Game.

2010
On June 16, 2010, the Green Bay Packers signed Williams to a one-year, $3.04 million restricted free agent tender. Head coach Mike McCarthy named Williams the starting cornerback to start the regular season, along with Charles Woodson. The job was left vacant after Al Harris was placed on the PUP list for the first six games before being released midseason. Special teams coordinator Shawn Slocum also named him the second punt returner on the depth chart behind Will Blackmon.

In Week 3, Williams recorded seven solo tackles and a sack in a 20–17 loss at the Chicago Bears. On October 17, 2010, he collected a season-high eight combined tackles, broke up a pass, and made an interception during a 23–20 loss to the Miami Dolphins in Week 6. On November 30, 2010, the Green Bay Packers signed Williams to a four-year, $33.07 million contract extension that includes $11.07 million and a signing bonus of $6 million. Williams finished his first full season as a starter with 57 combined tackles (50 solo), 20 combined tackles, six interceptions, and a sack in 16 games and 16 starts.

The Green Bay Packers finished second in the NFC North with a 10–6 record and defeated the Philadelphia Eagles 21–16 in the NFC Wildcard Game.  In that game, Williams had a game-saving interception in the final minute.  On January 16, 2011, Williams made a tackle, two pass deflections, two interceptions, and a touchdown during a 49–21 victory at the Atlanta Falcons in the NFC Divisional Round. He returned an interception by Matt Ryan for a 70-yard touchdown in the waning seconds before halftime. On January 20, 2011, Williams was added to the 2011 Pro Bowl roster as a reserve in place of Philadelphia Eagles cornerback Asante Samuel, who pulled out due to an injury. The Packers went on to reach Super Bowl XLV after defeating the Chicago Bears 21–14 in the NFC Championship. On February 6, 2011, Williams started in Super Bowl XLV and made six combined tackles and broke up a pass as the Packers defeated the Pittsburgh Steelers 31–25.

2011
Head coach Mike McCarthy retained Williams and Woodson as the starting cornerback duo to start the 2011 regular season. He was inactive for the Packers' Week 2 victory at the Carolina Panthers after injuring his shoulder the previous week. On November 6, 2011, he collected six combined tackles, two pass deflections, and returned an interception for a 43-yard touchdown during a 45–38 win at the San Diego Chargers in Week 9. In Week 11, Williams recorded a season-high nine combined tackles, broke up two passes, and made two interceptions in the Packers' 35–26 victory against the Tampa Bay Buccaneers. On January 1, 2012, Williams tied his season-high of nine combined tackles and deflected two passes during a 45–41 win against the Detroit Lions in Week 17. He finished the  season with 64 combined tackles (53 solo), a career-high 22 pass deflections, four interceptions, and a touchdown in 15 games and 15 starts.

2012
Defensive coordinator Dom Capers retained Williams as a starting cornerback to start the regular season, along with Sam Shields. On September 13, 2012, Williams made four solo tackles, deflected two passes, and intercepted two pass attempts by quarterback Jay Cutler in the Packers' 23–10 victory in Week 2. In Week 5, he made a season-high four pass deflections and seven solo tackles in a 30–27 loss at the Indianapolis Colts. The following week, Williams collected a season-high eight combined tackles and a pass deflection during a 42–24 win at the Houston Texans in Week 6. He completed the  season with 61 combined tackles (52 solo), 16 pass deflections, and two interceptions in 16 games and 16 starts.

2013
Williams and Shields remained the starting cornerbacks in 2013, ahead of Casey Hayward, Davon House, Micah Hyde, and Jarrett Bush. In Week 11, Williams made eight solo tackles, a pass deflection, and an interception during a 27–13 loss at the New York Giants. On December 15, 2013, he collected a season-high nine combined tackles, two pass deflections, and an interception during a 37–36 victory at the Dallas Cowboys in Week 15. He finished the season with a career-high 83 combined tackles (61 solo), 11 pass deflections, three interceptions, and 2.5 sacks in 16 games and 16 starts.

2014
On September 14, 2014, Williams made six combined tackles, two pass deflections, and an interception during a 31–24 victory against the New York Jets in Week 2. In Week 13, Williams collected a season-high nine combined tackles in the Packers' 26–21 win against the New England Patriots. Williams completed the  season with 70 combined tackles (60 solo), 13 pass deflections, and three interceptions in 16 games and 16 starts. Pro Football Focus gave Williams the 34th highest overall grade among the 108 qualifying cornerbacks in 2014.

Cleveland Browns

2015
Williams became an unrestricted free agent after the 2014 season and received interest from multiple teams, including the Baltimore Ravens, Green Bay Packers, Philadelphia Eagles, Cleveland Browns, and New Orleans Saints. The Green Bay Packers offered Williams a two-year, $8 million contract.

On March 16, 2015, the Cleveland Browns signed Williams to a three-year, $21 million contract that includes $10 million guaranteed and a signing bonus of $1.5 million.

Throughout training camp, he competed against Justin Gilbert for a job as a starting cornerback. Head coach Mike Pettine named Williams the starting cornerback to start the regular season, opposite Joe Haden.

On November 1, 2015, Williams recorded a season-high nine combined tackles and a pass deflection during a 34–20 loss to the Arizona Cardinals in Week 8. In Week 12, he made four combined tackles, broke up a pass, and made his first interception as a member of the Browns in their 33–27 loss to the Baltimore Ravens. He missed the Browns' Week 17 loss to the Pittsburgh Steelers after sustaining a concussion the previous week. He completed the  season with 69 combined tackles (55 solo), ten pass deflections, and an interception in 15 games and 15 starts. Pro Football Focus ranked him 54th in overall grades amongst qualifying cornerbacks in 2015.

2016
On January 4, 2016, the Cleveland Browns fired head coach Mike Pettine and general manager Ray Farmer after they finished with a 3–13 record. Throughout training camp, Williams competed to retain the job as a starting cornerback against Jamar Taylor. Head coach Hue Jackson named Williams the third cornerback on the depth chart to start the regular season, behind Joe Haden and Jamar Taylor, and the first-team nickelback. It marked the first time he was relegated being a backup in seven seasons.

On September 18, 2016, Williams recorded a season-high seven combined tackles during a 25–20 loss to the Baltimore Ravens in Week 2. He was sidelined for two games (Weeks 4–5) after injuring his shoulder in Week 3. On October 16, 2016, he made four combined tackles, a pass deflection, and an interception during a 28–26 loss at the Tennessee Titans in Week 6. Williams was inactive for another two games (Weeks 11–12) due to a knee injury. He completed the season with 36 combined tackles (28 solo), five pass deflections, and an interception in 12 games and seven starts. He earned the 96th highest overall grade among qualifying cornerbacks from Pro Football Focus in 2016.

2017
On February 7, 2017, the Cleveland Browns released Williams.

Arizona Cardinals

On July 30, 2017, the Arizona Cardinals signed Williams to a one-year, $2 million contract.

Throughout training camp, he competed for a job as a starting cornerback against Justin Bethel and Brandon Williams. Head coach Bruce Arians named him the third cornerback on the depth chart to start the 2017 regular season, behind Patrick Peterson and Justin Bethel.

Williams was inactive as a healthy scratch for three consecutive games (Weeks 3–5). In Week 6, he made a tackle and intercepted a pass by Ryan Fitzpatrick during a 38–33 win over the Tampa Bay Buccaneers. The following week, Williams earned his first start with the Cardinals after surpassing Justin Bethel on the depth chart. He finished the Cardinals' 33–0 loss to the Los Angeles Rams with a career-high ten solo tackles. On December 10, 2017, he made a season-high three pass deflections, two combined tackles, and an interception during a 12–7 win at the Tennessee Titans. He finished his only season with the Arizona Cardinals with 41 combined tackles (39 solo), 12 pass deflections, and two interceptions in 13 games and nine starts. Pro Football Focus gave Williams an overall grade of 88.8, which ranked ninth among all qualifying cornerbacks in 2017.

Green Bay Packers (second stint)

On March 22, 2018, the Green Bay Packers signed Williams to a two-year, $10 million contract that includes $4.75 million guaranteed and a signing bonus of $3.25 million.
During the season, Williams switched to free safety. Williams started seven games, and totaled 39 tackles, one tackle for a loss, one quarterback hit, two interceptions, eight passes defensed, one forced fumble, and two fumble recoveries.

Baltimore Ravens 
The Baltimore Ravens signed Williams on November 10, 2020, due to recurring cornerback injuries on the team. Williams played in 7 games for the Ravens, and totaled 15 tackles, two quarterback hits, and one pass defensed. He was waived on January 18, 2021.

Green Bay Packers (third stint)
On January 21, 2021, the Green Bay Packers signed Williams to their practice squad. He was elevated to the active roster on January 23 for the NFC Championship Game against the Tampa Bay Buccaneers, and reverted to the practice squad after the game. Williams did not play in the NFC Championship. His practice squad contract with the team expired after the season on February 1, 2021.

Williams announced his retirement on March 16, 2021, his 38th birthday.

Personal life
Williams is married to Shantrell Moore and has two children, Tramon Jr. and Trinity.

NFL career statistics

Regular season

Postseason

References

External links

Green Bay Packers bio
Cleveland Browns bio

1983 births
Living people
Sportspeople from Houma, Louisiana
Players of American football from Louisiana
American football cornerbacks
American football return specialists
Louisiana Tech Bulldogs football players
Houston Texans players
Green Bay Packers players
Cleveland Browns players
Arizona Cardinals players
Baltimore Ravens players
Ed Block Courage Award recipients